Kim Jung-heon is a South Korean actor. He is known for his roles in dramas such as No Matter What, Through the Waves, Golden Cross and Secrets of Women.

Filmography

Television series

Film

Music video

Theatre

References

External links
 
 

1987 births
Living people
South Korean male models
21st-century South Korean male actors
South Korean male film actors
South Korean male television actors